Atalaya is a town in the Ucayali Region of Peru. It is the capital of the Atalaya Province and the Raymondi District. It is located where the Tambo and Urubamba Rivers converge to form the Ucayali River.

It is served by the Tnte. Gral. Gerardo Pérez Pinedo Airport.

References

Populated places in the Ucayali Region